Cageman is a 1992 Hong Kong satirical comedy-drama film directed by Jacob Cheung. It won four awards at the 12th Hong Kong Film Awards held in 1993, including Best Film.

Plot
The movie explores the lives of tenants of the Wah Ha cage-house, who try to resist to stay in their cage-homes after the landlord announces he will take the building back and demolish it.

Cast
 Roy Chiao – Koo Yiu-Cho aka Fatso, the person in charge of the cage-house who collects rents and pays them to the landlord
 Liu Kai-chi – Prince Sam, Koo Yiu-Cho's adult son who has intellectual disability
 Wong Ka Kui – Mao, Lam Tsung's adopted son who joins to live with the tenants and has a criminal past
 Michael Lee Ming-Yeung – 7–11, a 99-year-old tenant who sells goods to other tenants
 Victor Wong – Sissy, a tenant who is close friends with 7-11 and assists him
 Teddy Robin – Tong Sam aka Monkey Man, a short tenant who owns a pet monkey named Tucker
 Lau Shun – Taoist, a philosophical tenant who always carries a bottle of wine with him
 Joe Junior – Charlie, a former tenant who often visits the cage-house and brings food for other tenants
 Ku Feng – Luk Tung, a tenant who works as a handyman
 Tats Lau – Brother Sang
 Chow Chung – Councillor Chow
 Dennis Chan – Councillor Tsui
 Bowie Wu – Officer Lam Tsung, Mao's adoptive father
 Teddy Chan – Possession order messenger
 Sze Kai-Keung – TV interviewer
 Herman Yau – TV director
 Tang Cheung – Dai Lap Hing

Awards and nominations

External links
 
 
 Hong Kong Cinemagic entry
 

1990s satirical films
1992 comedy-drama films
1992 films
Best Film HKFA
Films about friendship
Films about homelessness
Films about intellectual disability
Films about old age
Films about poverty
Films directed by Jacob Cheung
Films set in Hong Kong
Hong Kong comedy-drama films
1990s Hong Kong films